Baron Mōri Gorō of Chōshū (1871–1925) was the fifth son of the former head of the Chōshū clan, Mōri Motonori (1839–1896, Duke under the Kazoku system). After almost three years of study in Hastings he was admitted to Gonville and Caius College in 1892. He graduated in 1895 with an ordinary B.A. after taking the examination in Politics and Economics, and became a director of the 110th Bank among other posts before becoming a member of the House of Peers (Kizokuin).

The funds for Mōri Gorō's education were raised with the support of the influential Chōshū man, Kaoru Inoue.

1871 births
1925 deaths
Members of the House of Peers (Japan)